The 301st Heavy Tank Battalion of the American Expeditionary Forces (AEF) was a Heavy Tank unit during World War I. Of the eight heavy battalions (the 301st to 308th) raised, only the 301st saw combat. The 301st was reorganized post-war into the 66th Infantry Regiment (Light Tanks), later to become the 66th Armor Regiment, the oldest armored regiment in the United States Army.

Formation

The 301st went many name changes being formed as the "1st Separate Tank Battalion, Heavy Tank Service, 65th Engineers." When it arrived at the Tank School in Bovington, UK it was redesignated the "41st Tank Battalion." In June 1918 the AEF changed their naming system and which gave the unit its final name, 301st Heavy Tank Battalion. The British agreed to provide 47 Mark V Tanks to the Americans but only if the unit was attached to the British Fourth Army.

Operational history

The 301st, equipped with British Mark V heavy tanks, suffered large casualties in the Battle of St. Quentin Canal on 29 September as part of the British 4th Tank Brigade, under the control of the Australian Corps. Efforts were made to hide the Tanks moving up to the front lines by having Planes fly over German lines. The attack started at 5.50 a.m. in a thick mist.  Some tanks were hit by shelling before the start line, while others were lost crossing an unreported British minefield. Of the 34 participating tanks, only 10 reached their objective. Of the crews of the 40 tanks of the 301st Battalion, 112 were casualties. The numbers broke down as three officers and 20 enlisted men were killed, seven officers and 55 enlisted men were severely wounded and eight officers and 15 enlisted men were slightly wounded, and one officer and six enlisted men missing.

The 301st then seized the village of Brancourt on 8 October, fought in the Battle of the Selle on October 17, 1918. During the fighting, the Tanks were required to cross the Selle River a tributary of the Somme. US planners were able to use low-flying aeroplane reconnaissance to select good shallow crossings and 19 tanks out of the 20 operating successfully crossed the stream. 

Their four and final battle was the night attack on 22–23 October in the vicinity of the Sambre Canal.  Nine Tanks from the 301st were assigned to the 1st British Division on German lines near Bazuel, south-east of Le Cateau. At H-hour, all nine Tanks moved forward rapidly, taking out German strong points. They moved so fast that their supporting infantry had trouble keeping up with them.  All Tanks reached their objectives with only five casualties when one of the Tank crews was gassed but was successfully treated.

Post-war
The AEF Tank Corps was removed after 11 November 1918, armistice and remaining tank corps personnel transferred to the United States, where the Tank Corps, National Army was disbanded with the National Army in 1920. Headquarters and Headquarters Company (HHC), 304th Tank Brigade, Tank Corps transferred to Camp Meade, Maryland and consolidated with HHC, 305th Tank Brigade on 22 June 1921, reorganized and was redesignated HHC, 1st Tank Group. This organization was reorganized and redesignated HHC, 1st Tank Regiment on 1 September 1929. The 1st Tank Regiment was reorganized and redesignated the 66th Infantry Regiment (Light Tanks) on 25 October 1932. After the war, the 301st transitioned in the Regular Army to become the 66th Infantry Regiment (Light Tanks) by way of the 16th Tank Battalion.

See also
66th Infantry Regiment (Light Tanks) - Modern successor Tank Unit of the 301st
Tank Corps of the American Expeditionary Forces

Bibliography 
Notes

References 
 - Total pages: 398
  
 - Total pages: 244 
  

 - Total pages: 2,454

Armored regiments of the United States Army 
Military units and formations established in 1918
Military units and formations of the United States in World War I